A lymphad  or galley is a charge used primarily in Scottish heraldry. It is a single-masted ship propelled by oars.  In addition to the mast and oars, the lymphad has three flags and a basket. The word comes from the Scottish Gaelic long fhada, meaning a long ship or birlinn. It usually indicates a title associated with islands, such as Lord of the Isles, specifically those on the west coast of Scotland, including the Hebrides - but is not limited to Scottish arms: prominent examples including the coats of arms of New Zealand and New Brunswick.

Although the drawing of the lymphad for heraldic design purposes naturally became standardized, there are minor differences. These usually involve the position of the sails and oars and the tincture of the flags. There are other variations as well, such as the tincture of the ship. Additionally, the basket may be afire and a crew may be depicted.

Gallery

Examples 
The Captain of Clan Chattan
field: Or, lymphad: Azure, sail furled, oars shown in saltire over the boat, flags Gules.

Lordship of the Isles
field: Or, lymphad: Sable, sail furled, oars in action, flags Gules.

MacAlister of the Loup
The lymphad is shown on an eagle's breast, Gules, lymphad Sable, sail furled, oars in action, flags Sable.

 Macdonald, Lord of the Isles  field: Or, lymphad Sable, sail furled, oars in action, flags Gules, with an eagle displayed on the boat.

MacDougall of MacDougall  field: Or, lymphad Sable, sail furled, oars in action, flags Gules, with a fire basket fired on top of the mast.

McBain of Kinchyle  field: Or, lymphad Azure, sails furled (Argent), oars in saltire, Gules, flags Gules.

Macfie of Colonsay  field: Or, lymphad Sable, full sails Argent, no oars, flags Gules.

MacGillivray of Dunmaglass  field: Azure, lymphad Or, sails furled, oars in action, flags Gules.

MacIain of Ardnamurchan  field: Or, lymphad Sable, sails furled, oars in action, flags Gules.

Mackinnon of Mackinnon   field: Or, lymphad Sable, sails furled, oars in saltire, flags Gules.

The Mackintosh  field: Or, lymphad Azure, sails furled, oars in saltire (gules), flags Gules.

Maclachlan of Maclachlan  field: Or, lymphad Sable, sail furled, no oars, flags Gules.

Maclaren of Maclaren  field: Or, lymphad Sable, sail furled, oars in action, flags Sable.

Maclean of Duart  field: Or, lymphad Sable, sails furled, oars in saltire, flags Gules.

MacNeil of Barra  field: Or, lymphad Sable, sails furled, oars in action, flags Gules.

Cluny Macpherson  field: per fesse (divided horizontally) Or and Azure, lymphad Or on the Azure, Azure on the Or (i.e.counterchanged), sails furled, oars in action, flags Gules.

The Captain of Clan Ranald  field: Or, lymphad Sable, sail furled, oars in saltire, flags Gules.

 Shaw of Rothiemurchus  field: Or, lymphad Azure, sail furled, oars in saltire (azure), flags Gules. Despite the English surname, Shaw, the arms have a "Highland", Gaelic appearance.

Comhairle nan Eilean Siar

External links

References

Scottish heraldry